Georgios Zindros (born in 1955) a Greek football player, was a star winger for Aris Thessaloniki F.C. during the golden period of the late 1970. He was born in Romania by Greek parents and started his career in Universitatea Craiova. In 1976, he was transferred to Aris after a demand from Alketas Panagoulias. After 202 appearances and 46 goal, he continued his career to Olympiakos and later to Apollon Kalamarias. He made two appearances for Greece national team.

References

External links
 

1955 births
Living people
Sportspeople from Oradea
Apollon Pontou FC players
Romanian people of Greek descent
Greek footballers
Super League Greece players
Liga I players
FC Bihor Oradea players
CS Universitatea Craiova players
Aris Thessaloniki F.C. players
Olympiacos F.C. players
Greece international footballers
Association football midfielders